GBA-17 (Tangir-I) is a constituency of Gilgit Baltistan Assembly of the Tangir District which is currently represented by Rehmat Khaliq of Jamiat Ulema-e-Islam (F).

History 
Before 2019, the constituency was of Diamer District and was known as GBA-17 (Diamer-III). In 2019, Tangir was made a district. The constituency is known as Tangir-I.

Members

Election results

2009
Rahmat Khaliq of JUI-F became member of assembly in 2009 elections.

2015
Haidar Khan of Pakistan Muslim League (N) won this seat by getting 3,622 votes.

References

Gilgit-Baltistan Legislative Assembly constituencies